Jean-Pierre Tokoto II (born September 15, 1993) is an American-Cameroon professional basketball player for Hapoel Tel Aviv of the Israeli Basketball Premier League. He played college basketball for the University of North Carolina before playing professionally in the NBA G League, Australia, Israel, and Spain.

High school career
Born in Rockford, Illinois, Tokoto attended Menomonee Falls High School in southern Wisconsin, where he averaged 21.2 points, 13.2 rebounds, 3.2 steals, and 2.1 assists as a junior and 24.6 points, 11.5 rebounds, 3.5 assists and 2.6 steals as a senior, earning three-time first-team all-state selection, set several school records, among them, career scoring, rebounding and steals and the school's single-game record with 48 points against Catholic Memorial High School. He also earned Greater Metro Conference Player of the Year honors as a junior and won the 2012 American Family Insurance Slam Dunk contest in New Orleans as a senior.

College career
Tokoto played three years of college basketball for the North Carolina Tar Heels. As a junior, he averaged 8.3 points and 4.3 assists per game and was known for his dunking ability and defensive prowess. He declared for the 2015 NBA draft on April 8, 2015 after his junior season.

Professional career

Oklahoma City Blue (2015–2016) 
On June 25, 2015, Tokoto was selected with the 58th overall pick in the 2015 NBA draft by the Philadelphia 76ers and joined them for the 2015 NBA Summer League. On September 27, 2015, he signed a one-year, non-guaranteed tender worth $525,000 with the 76ers. However, he was waived by the team on October 26 after appearing in five preseason games. On October 30, he joined the 76ers' D-League affiliate team, the Delaware 87ers. The following day, he was acquired by the Oklahoma City Blue in a trade with the 87ers. In 49 games for the Blue in 2015–16, he averaged 11.2 points, 4.1 rebounds, 2.1 assists and 1.5 steals per game.

Rio Grande Valley Vipers (2016–2017) 
In July 2016, Tokoto joined the New York Knicks for the 2016 NBA Summer League. He signed with the Knicks on August 2, but was waived on October 21 after appearing in three preseason games. On October 25, he returned to the Oklahoma City Blue, only to be traded to the Rio Grande Valley Vipers five days later. In 52 games for the Vipers in 2016–17, he averaged 11.7 points, 5.0 rebounds, 2.4 assists and 2.1 steals per game.

Perth Wildcats (2017–2018) 
In July 2017, Tokoto joined the Utah Jazz for the 2017 NBA Summer League. On September 6, 2017, he signed with the Perth Wildcats for the 2017–18 NBL season. He appeared in all 30 games for the Wildcats in 2017–18, averaging 15.4 points, 6.0 rebounds, 2.8 assists and 1.6 steals per game.

Hapoel Eliat (2018–2019) 
On June 27, 2018, Tokoto secured a spot on the Golden State Warriors' roster for the 2018 NBA Summer League.

On July 28, 2018, Tokoto signed a one-year deal with the Israeli team Hapoel Eilat. On January 2, 2019, Tokoto recorded a career-high 31 points, shooting 9-of-12 from the field, along with six rebounds, six assists and three steals for 45 PIR, leading Eilat to a 95–89 win over Hapoel Tel Aviv. He was subsequently named Israeli League Round 12 MVP. On April 12, 2019, Tokoto participated in the 2019 Israeli League All-Star Game, where he recorded 19 points along with five rebounds and was named the All-Star Game MVP.  In 38 games played for Eilat, Tokoto led the team in rebounds (7.6) and steals (1.4) per game, to go with 13.4 points and 3.1 assists per game. Tokoto helped Eilat reach the 2019 Israeli League Final Four, where they eventually lost to Maccabi Tel Aviv.

Burgos (2019–2020) 
On July 3, 2019, Tokoto signed a one-year deal with the Spanish club San Pablo Burgos. He appeared in 26 games for Burgos in the Liga ACB and the Champions League, averaging 7 points, 5 rebounds and 1.5 steals per game. On January 25, 2020, Tokoto parted ways with Burgos.

Ironi Ness Ziona (2020) 
On January 26, 2020, Tokoto returned to Israel for a second stint, signing with Ironi Nes Ziona for the rest of the season. On February 2, 2020, he made his debut in an 83–88 loss to Ironi Nahariya, recording a double-double of 17 points and 11 rebounds off the bench.

Hapoel Tel Aviv (2020–present) 
On November 14, 2020, Tokoto signed with Hapoel Tel Aviv.

Career Statistics

|-
| align=center | 2015-16
| align=left | Oklahoma City Blue 
| NBA D-League
| 48 || 26.6 || .460 || .250 || .712 || 4 || 2 || 1.5 || .5 || 11.2
|-
| align=center | 2016-17
| align=left | Rio Grande Valley Vipers 
| NBA D-League
| 52 || 33.4 || .475 || .325 || .686 || 5 || 2.4 || 2.1 || .4 || 11.7
|-
| align=center | 2017-18
| align=left | Perth Wildcats 
| AUS NBL
| 30 || 28.2 || .464 || .256 || .719 || 5.9 || 2.8 || 1.7 || .5 || 15.4
|-
| align=center | 2018-19
| align=left | Hapoel Eilat BC 
| ISBL
| 38 || 28.1 || .528 || .269 || .654 || 7.6 || 3.2 || 1.5 || .3 || 13.4
|-
| align=center | 2019-20
| align=left | San Pablo Burgos 
| ACB
| 26 || 21.4 || .528 || .182 || .609 || 5.1 || 1.5 || 1 || .3 || 7.0
|-
| align=center | 2019-20
| align=left | Ironi Nes Ziona 
| ISBL
| 15 || 31.3 || .563 || .000 || .529 || 8.9 || 4.2 || 2.2 || .6 || 14.4
|-
| align=center | 2020-21
| align=left | Hapoel Tel Aviv 
| ISBL
| 16 || 28.9 || .500 || .294 || .596 || 5.3 || 5.3 || 1.6 || .4 || 13.6
|-
| align=center | 2021-22
| align=left | Hapoel Tel Aviv 
| ISBL
| 31 || 31.7 || .474 || .160 || .706 || 7.5 || 3.5 || 1.5 || .3 || 14.5
|-

College statistics

|-
| style="text-align:left;"| 2012–2013
| style="text-align:left;"| North Carolina
| 35 || 0 || 8.7 || .488 || .091 || .385 || 1.7 || .7 || .5 || .1 || 2.6
|-
| style="text-align:left;"| 2013–2014
| style="text-align:left;"| North Carolina
| 34 || 33 || 28.6 || .489 || .222 || .500 || 5.8 || 3 || 1.6 || .5 || 9.3
|-
| style="text-align:left;"| 2014–2015
| style="text-align:left;"| North Carolina
| 38 || 34 || 29.1 || .428 || .375 || .615 || 5.6 || 4.3 || 1.5 || .3 || 8.3
|-
| style="text-align:center;" colspan="2"|Career
| 107 || 67 || 22.3 || .462 || .266 || .544 || 4.4 || 2.7 || 1.2 || .3 || 6.8

Personal life
Tokoto was named after his maternal grandfather, Jean-Pierre Tokoto, who played soccer for the Cameroon national team. He starred in all three games for Cameroon at the 1982 FIFA World Cup. Tokoto's mother, Laurence Tokoto Trimble, met her husband, Trevor Trimble, in Menomonee Falls, Wisconsin. Tokoto's biological father is former NBA player Brian Oliver. Seth Trimble, Tokoto’s younger half-brother, committed to play college basketball for Tokoto’s alma mater North Carolina in June 2021, set to join the team following his high school graduation in 2022.

References

External links
 North Carolina Tar Heels bio
 RealGM profile
 Sports-Reference profile

1993 births
Living people
African-American basketball players
American expatriate basketball people in Australia
American expatriate basketball people in Israel
American expatriate basketball people in Spain
American men's basketball players
American people of Cameroonian descent
Basketball players from Illinois
CB Miraflores players
Hapoel Eilat basketball players
Hapoel Tel Aviv B.C. players
Ironi Nes Ziona B.C. players
Liga ACB players
North Carolina Tar Heels men's basketball players
Oklahoma City Blue players
People from Menomonee Falls, Wisconsin
Perth Wildcats players
Philadelphia 76ers draft picks
Power forwards (basketball)
Rio Grande Valley Vipers players
Small forwards
Sportspeople from Rockford, Illinois
21st-century African-American sportspeople